The title of Earl of Lancaster was created in the Peerage of England in 1267. It was succeeded by the title Duke of Lancaster in 1351, which expired in 1361. (The most recent creation of the ducal title merged with the Crown in 1413.)

King Henry III of England created the Earldom of Lancasterfrom which the royal house of Henry IV was namedfor his second son, Edmund Crouchback, in 1267. Edmund had already been created Earl of Leicester in 1265 and following the Second Barons' War and the death and attainder of the king's rebellious brother-in-law Simon de Montfort, 6th Earl of Leicester in 1265, the latter's lands, including most notably Kenilworth Castle in Warwickshire, had been awarded to him.

When Edmund's son Thomas, 2nd Earl of Lancaster, inherited the estates and title of his father-in-law Henry de Lacy, 3rd Earl of Lincoln, he became at a stroke the most powerful nobleman in England, with lands throughout the kingdom and the ability to raise vast private armies to wield power at national and local levels. This brought himand his younger brother Henry, 3rd Earl of Lancasterinto conflict with their first cousin King Edward II, leading to Thomas's execution. Henry inherited Thomas's titles and he and his son Henry of Grosmont, 1st Duke of Lancaster, gave loyal service to Edward's son King Edward III.

History

Creation
After the supporters of Henry III of England suppressed opposition from the English nobility in the Second Barons' War, Henry granted to his second son Edmund Crouchback the titles and possessions forfeited by attainder of the barons' leader, Simon de Montfort, 6th Earl of Leicester, including the Earldom of Leicester, on 26 October 1265. Later grants included the first Earldom of Lancaster on 30 June 1267 and that of Earl Ferrers in 1301. Edmund was also Count of Champagne and Brie from 1276 by right of his wife. Henry IV of England would later use his descent from Edmund to legitimise his claim to the throne, even making the spurious claim that Edmund was the elder son of Henry but had been passed over as king because of his deformity.

 Edmund's second marriage to Blanche of Artois, the widow of the King of Navarre, placed him at the centre of the European aristocracy. Blanche's daughter Joan I of Navarre was queen regnant of Navarre and through her marriage to Philip IV of France was queen consort of France. Edmund's son Thomas became the most powerful nobleman in England, gaining the Earldoms of Lincoln and Salisbury through marriage to the heiress of Henry de Lacy, 3rd Earl of Lincoln. His income was £11,000 per annumdouble that of the next wealthiest earl.

Thomas and his younger brother Henry served in the coronation of their cousin King Edward II of England on 25 February 1308; Thomas carried Curtana, the Sword of Mercy, and Henry carried the royal sceptre. After initially supporting Edward, Thomas became one of the Lords Ordainers, who demanded the banishment of Piers Gaveston and the governance of the realm by a baronial council. After Gaveston was captured, Thomas took the lead in his trial and execution at Warwick in 1312. Edward's authority was weakened by poor governance and defeat by the Scots at the Battle of Bannockburn. This allowed Thomas to restrain Edward's power by republishing the Ordinances of 1311. Following this achievement Thomas took little part in the governance of the realm and instead retreated to Pontefract Castle. This allowed Edward to regroup and re-arm, leading to a fragile peace in August 1318 with the Treaty of Leake. In 1321 Edward's rule again collapsed into civil war. Thomas raised a northern army but was defeated and captured at the Battle of Boroughbridge. He was sentenced to be hanged, drawn and quartered but because he was Edward's cousin he was given a quicker death by beheading.

Henry joined the revolt of Edward's wife Isabella of France and her lover Mortimer in 1326, pursuing and capturing Edward at Neath in South Wales. Following Edward's deposition at the Parliament of Kenilworth in 1326 and reputed murder at Berkeley Castle, Thomas's conviction was posthumously reversed and Henry regained possession of the Earldoms of Lancaster, Derby, Salisbury and Lincoln that had been forfeit for Thomas's treason. His restored prestige led to him knighting the young King Edward III of England before his coronation. Mortimer lost support over the Treaty of Edinburgh–Northampton that formalised Scotland's independence, and his developing power in the Welsh Marches provoked jealousy from the barons. When Mortimer called a parliament to make his new powers and estates permanent with the title of Earl of March in 1328, Henry led the opposition and held a counter-meeting. In response, Mortimer ravaged the lands of Lancaster and checked the revolt. Edward III was able to assume control in 1330 but Henry's further influence was restricted by poor health and blindness for the last fifteen years of his life.

Succession

Henry's son, also called Henry, was born at the castle of Grosmont in Monmouthshire between 1299 and 1314. According to the younger Henry's memoirs, he was better at martial arts than academic subjects and did not learn to read until later in life. Henry was coeval with Edward III and was pivotal to his reign, becoming his best friend and most trusted commander. Henry was knighted in 1330, represented his father in parliament and fought in Edward's Scottish campaign. After the outbreak of the Hundred Years' War, Henry took part in several diplomatic missions and minor campaigns and was present at the great English victory in the naval Battle of Sluys in 1340. Later, he was required to commit himself as hostage in the Low Countries for Edward's considerable debts. He remained hostage for a year and had to pay a large ransom for his own release.

In 1345, Edward III launched a major, three-pronged attack on France. The Earl of Northampton attacked from Brittany, Edward from Flanders, and Henry from Aquitaine in the south. Moving rapidly through the country, Henry confronted the Comte d'Isle at the Battle of Auberoche and achieved a victory described as "the greatest single achievement of Lancaster's entire military career". The ransom from the prisoners has been estimated at £50,000. Edward rewarded Henry by including him as a founding knight of the Order of the Garter. An even greater honour was bestowed on Lancaster when Edward created him Duke of Lancaster. The title of duke was relatively new in England, with only Cornwall being a previous ducal title. Lancaster was also given palatinate status for the county of Lancashire, which entailed a separate administration independent of the crown. There were two other counties palatine; Durham was an ancient ecclesiastical palatinate and Chester was crown property.

Earls of Lancaster

| Edmund Crouchback, 1st Earl of Lancaster and Leicester ||  || 16 January 1245Londonson of Henry III of England and Eleanor of Provence|| (1) Aveline de Forz12690 children(2) Blanche of Artois21 September 12714 childrenThomas, 2nd Earl of LancasterHenry, 3rd Earl of LancasterJohn of Lancaster, Lord of BeaufortMary of Lancaster||5 June 1296Bayonne, Gasconyaged 51
|-
| Thomas, 2nd Earl of Lancaster and Leicester||  ||  1278Grismond Castle, Monmouthshireson of Edmund Crouchback and Blanche of Artois || Alice de Lacy, 4th Countess of Lincoln28 October 1294 – Divorced 13180 children || 22 March 1322Pontefract, YorkshireExecuted by order of Edward II of Englandaged 43–44
|-
| Henry, 3rd Earl of Lancaster and Leicester|| ||1281Grosmont Castle, Monmouthshireson of Edmund Crouchback and Blanche of Artois||Matilda de Chaworth7 childrenHenry of Grosmont, 1st Duke of LancasterBlanche of Lancaster, Baroness Wake of LiddellMaud of Lancaster, Countess of UlsterJoan of Lancaster, Baroness MowbrayIsabel of Lancaster, Prioress of AmesburyEleanor of Lancaster, Countess of ArundelMary of Lancaster, Baroness Percy ||22 September 1345Leicestershireaged 63–64
|-
| Henry of Grosmont, 1st Duke of Lancaster, 4th Earl of Lancaster and Leicester||  ||  1310Grosmont Castle, Monmouthshireson of Henry, 3rd Earl of Lancaster || Isabel de Beaumont13342 childrenMaud, Countess of LeicesterBlanche, Duchess of Lancaster || 23 March 1361Leicester Castle, LeicestershireBlack Deathaged 50–51
|-
| Blanche, 5th Countess of Lancaster and Leicester|| ||25 March 1345Bolingbroke Castle, Lincolnshiredaughter of Henry of Grosmont|| John of Gaunt19 May 13597 childrenPhilippa, Queen of PortugalJohn of LancasterElizabeth of Lancaster, Duchess of ExeterEdward of LancasterJohn of LancasterHenry IV Bolingbroke, King of EnglandIsabel of Lancaster || 12 September 1369Tutbury Castle, StaffordshireBlack Deathaged 23

|}

Family tree

See also
Duke of Lancaster

Notes

References

Sources

 

 
 

 

 Earl
1267 establishments in England
1361 disestablishments in England
Earl
Earl
British and Irish peerages which merged in the Crown
Extinct earldoms in the Peerage of England
Noble titles created in 1267